The following are events in 1877 which are relevant to the development of association football. Included are events in closely related codes, such as the Sheffield Rules, amalgamated into the FA Rules in 1877.

Events
 The Sheffield Rules are amalgamated into the FA Rules.

Clubs founded

England
 Buxton
 Clitheroe
 Crewe Alexandra
 Egham Town (originally known as Runnymede Rovers)
 Wolverhampton Wanderers

Scotland
 Clyde
 St Mirren

Domestic cups

Births
 25 February – John Tait Robertson (d. 1935), Scotland international half-back in sixteen matches (1898–1905).
 27 April – Andy Aitken (d. 1955), Scotland international half-back in fourteen matches (1901–1911).
 13 May – Robert Hamilton (d. 1948), Scotland international forward in eleven matches (1899–1911), scoring fifteen goals.
 15 September – Peter McBride (d. 1951), Scotland international goalkeeper in six matches (1904–1909).
 2 October – John Campbell (d. 1919), Scotland international forward in four matches (1899–1901), scoring six goals.
 4 October – Jimmy Watson (d. unknown), Scotland international full-back in six matches (1903–1909).
 22 November – Herbert Smith (d. 1951), England international full-back in four matches (1905–1906).

References

 
Association football by year